Pilot Officer Raymond Mayhew Lewin GC (14 January 1915 – 21 November 1941) of the Royal Air Force Volunteer Reserve (RAFVR) was (whilst a Sergeant) awarded the George Cross for the courage he showed in rescuing his co-pilot from their burning plane on 3 November 1940 in Malta.

Biography
He was born on 14 January 1915, in Kettering and was educated at Kimbolton School. He joined the RAFVR in the spring of 193.6

On 15 March 1941 he was commissioned as a Pilot Officer (with seniority backdated to 27 January 1941).  He was killed in action on 21 November 1941, whilst flying with No. 109 Squadron, and is buried in his home town of Kettering.

George Cross citation
The citation was published in the London Gazette of 7 March 1941 (dated 11 March):

Medals
Pilot Officer Lewin's citation, photographs, medals and a copy of his George Cross medal can be viewed at (1101) Kettering Air Cadets (Kettering, England) by appointment on Monday and Wednesday evenings. The squadron also parades at his graveside on Remembrance Day each year as a mark of respect for one of 1101 squadron's ex members.

See also
 List of George Cross recipients

References

1915 births
1941 deaths
People from Kettering
Royal Air Force officers
People educated at St Edward's School, Oxford
British recipients of the George Cross
Royal Air Force Volunteer Reserve personnel of World War II
Royal Air Force personnel killed in World War II
Military personnel from Northamptonshire